Pink Up is the sixth EP by South Korean girl group Apink, released on June 26, 2017. The album's lead single is the title track "Five".

Track listing

Charts

Album

Sales and certifications

References

External links
 
 

Apink albums
2017 EPs
Korean-language EPs
Kakao M EPs